Knipper Theatre, Kniper Theatre or Knieper Theatre was the venue of a German theatrical troupe led by Karl Kniper which performed in Saint Petersburg beginning in 1775, and ending in 1797.

History
The theatre building was converted from a manège (riding school), located on the Tsaritsa Meadow near the present-day Tripartite Bridge. From 1770 to 1777 it was occupied by English comedians, until they were replaced with Karl Knipper's German troupe.

In 1779 Knipper signed a contract with the Foundling Home that established the Volny Rossiysky Teatre (Вольный Российский Театр – The Free Russian Theatre). As part of this contract the Board of Trustees of the St Petersburg chapter of the Foundling Home ("Петербургский  воспитательный дом" or "educational home") sent Knipper 50 of its pupils to instruct and eventually incorporate into spectacles. The composer Vasily Pashkevich was the pupils' music instructor. From 1782 to 1783 the director of the theatre was the well-known Russian actor Ivan Dmitrievsky, who performed at his benefice the famous comedy Nedorosl ( – The Minor) by Denis Fonvizin (1782). Choreographer Gasparo Angiolini and ballet dancer Francesco Rosetti were briefly dance instructors.

On 12 July 1783 the Imperial Theaters acquired the building and later Knipper's German troupe as well, but the Free Russian Theatre was dissolved. The building was renamed the Gorodskoy Derevyanny Theatre ( – The Wooden Town Theatre ) or Maly Theatre ( – Little Theatre). This existed until 1797, when it was dismantled at the demand of Paul I of Russia, because it was obstructing troop maneuvering during parades.

Repertoire
The repertoire of Knipper's German Theatre included: 
 Guglielmi Robert und Kalliste 
 Wolf Die Dorfdeputierten
 Schweitzer Das Elysium
 Holli Der Bassa von Tunis
 Stegman Der Deserteur
 Hiller Der Jagd 
 Bender Der Walder
 Hiller Die Jubelhochzeit
 Hefe Die Apotheke
 Hiller Die Liebe auf dem Lande
 Hiller Der Dorfbarbier
 Hiller Lottchen am Hofe
 Wolf Das Grosse Los 
 Gretri Lucile
 Stegman Das Redende Gemälde 
 Piccini Die Nacht

The repertoire of the Free Russian Theatre included the following operas:

Vasily Pashkevich: Misfortune from a Coach (Несчастье от кареты – Neschastye ot karety  7 November 1779 St Petersburg Libretto by Yakov Knyazhnin) 
Mikhail Sokolovsky: The Miller - a Wizard, a Cheat and a Match-maker (Мельник – колдун, обманщик и сват – Melnik – koldun, obmanshchik i svat to the text by Alexander Ablesimov, first in 1779 Moscow, c.1795 St Petersburg)
Ivan Kerzelli: Rozana i Lyubim (Розана и Любим – Rozana und Lyubim, four-act opera, text by Nikolai Nikolev,  first in 1778, Moscow) 
Vasily Pashkevich: The Saint-Petersburg Bazaar (Санкт-Петербургский Гостиный Двор – Sankt Peterburgskiy Gostinyi Dvor 1782 St Petersburg), etc.

Notes

External links
 Teatralnaya entsiklopedia (in Russian)

Theatres in Saint Petersburg
Opera houses in Russia
1777 establishments in the Holy Roman Empire
1797 disestablishments in the Holy Roman Empire
18th century in Saint Petersburg